Marney is a surname. Notable people with the surname include:

 Dan Marney (born 1981), professional footballer
 Dean Marney (author) (born 1952), the author of several children's books
 Dean Marney (footballer) (born 1984), English footballer
 Harold Marney, a crew member of John F. Kennedy's PT-109 who was killed when the boat was struck by a Japanese destroyer
 Henry Marney, 1st Baron Marney (1447–1523), English Tudor politician
 Jo Marney, British model
 Laura Marney, Scottish novelist and short-story writer
 Paul Marney (born 1982), English footballer

See also
 Layer Marney, a village in Essex, England
 Layer Marney Tower, a Tudor palace near Colchester, Essex, England
 Marni
 Marnie (disambiguation)
 Marnay, including a list of people with the surname
 De Marney, a surname